Blake Edward Hawksworth (born March 1, 1983) is a baseball coach and former Major League Baseball pitcher. He played college baseball at Bellevue Community College in 2002 and professionally for the St. Louis Cardinals and Los Angeles Dodgers between 2009 and 2011.

Early life and career beginnings
He played one year of baseball at Bellevue Community College (now simply Bellevue College) before signing with the Cardinals as a draft and follow. Prior to playing at Bellevue Community College, Blake played several years under Bill Caudill for the Mercer Islanders and Fox Sports. In , he played for the Memphis Redbirds and ended the season with a disappointing 4–13 record with a 5.28 ERA. And in 2008, he went 5–7 with a 6.09 ERA.

Major leagues

St. Louis Cardinals
He made his major league debut on June 6, 2009, pitching two IP, giving up four runs, three hits (including a home run), walking one, and striking out one. Despite this, his debut was looked at as positive because of his excellent pitch command. The Cardinals had high hopes for him in the future, as he was one of the organization's better young pitching talents.

Hawksworth was hit in the face near his mouth by a line drive by outfielder Sam Fuld, and crumpled to the ground, in a game in September 2010. He left the field under his own power and was taken to hospital.  The injury required approximately 20 stitches, and ended his season.

In two seasons with the Cardinals, he appeared in 75 games, starting eight of them. His overall record was 8–8 with  a 4.07 ERA.

Los Angeles Dodgers
On November 30, 2010, he was traded to the Los Angeles Dodgers for infielder Ryan Theriot. He appeared in 49 games for the Dodgers, all in relief, with a 2–5 record and 4.08 ERA.

Hawksworth began feeling tenderness and discomfort in his elbow during the offseason and underwent elbow surgery in early January 2012. This injury caused him to be placed on the 60-day disabled list at the start of the season. He began a rehab assignment in June but was shut down after a couple of appearances due to shoulder soreness. On August 23, he underwent arthroscopic shoulder surgery, which ended any chance he had to return in 2012 and the report from the team was that he might also miss the 2013 season as a result of the recovery period. On October 12, 2012 the Dodgers outrighted him to AAA and removed him from the 40-man roster. On October 17, he elected to become a free agent.

Hawksworth retired in February 2014.

Coaching
After his baseball career ended due to injury, Hawksworth became an assistant basketball coach at Eastlake High School.

On August 20, 2019, Blake Hawksworth was named as the Pitching Coach for Grand Canyon University for the 2020 baseball season.

Personal life
His older sister Erin is a television sports anchor in Washington, D.C., and his grandfather Jack Poole was the head of the VANOC bid committee that brought the Winter Olympics to Vancouver.

References

External links

Blake Hawksworth page at Foxsports.com
Official Cardinals Profile
Blake Hawksworth page at Stlcardinals.scout.com
Career Profile at Mahalo.com

1983 births
Bellevue Bulldogs baseball players
Canadian emigrants to the United States
Living people
People from North Vancouver
St. Louis Cardinals players
Los Angeles Dodgers players
Major League Baseball pitchers
Major League Baseball players from Canada
Baseball people from British Columbia
Johnson City Cardinals players
New Jersey Cardinals players
Palm Beach Cardinals players
Peoria Chiefs players
Springfield Cardinals players
Memphis Redbirds players
Gulf Coast Cardinals players
Rancho Cucamonga Quakes players
People from Sammamish, Washington
Cal State Fullerton Titans baseball coaches
Grand Canyon Antelopes baseball coaches